Savinsky District is an administrative and municipal district (raion), one of the twenty-one in Ivanovo Oblast, Russia. It is located in the south of the oblast. Its administrative center is the urban locality (a settlement) of Savino. Population:   14,471 (2002 Census);  The population of Savino accounts for 46.2% of the district's total population.

References

Notes

Sources

Districts of Ivanovo Oblast